Nivskaya is a rural locality (a village) in Kolengskoye Rural Settlement, Verkhovazhsky District, Vologda Oblast, Russia. The population was 30 as of 2002.

Geography 
Nivskaya is located 52 km east of Verkhovazhye (the district's administrative centre) by road. Noginskaya is the nearest rural locality.

References 

Rural localities in Verkhovazhsky District